FMI may refer to:

 Danish Defence Acquisition and Logistics Organization, abbreviated FMI in Danish.
 Finnish Meteorological Institute
 First Myanmar Investment
 FMI Air, a Burmese airline
 Folkebevegelsen mot innvandring, a Norwegian anti-immigration group
 Food Marketing Institute
 Foundation Medicine, an American biotechnology company
 Freedom Movement of Iran
 Friedrich Miescher Institute for Biomedical Research, Switzerland
 Functional Mock-up Interface
 International Monetary Fund, in French, Spanish, Portuguese and Italian "FMI", or "Fonds monétaire international"
 Kalemie Airport, in Katanga Province, Democratic Republic of the Congo